Joseph Carson is the name of:

 Joseph Carson (pharmacist) (1808–1876), American physician and botanist
 Joseph K. Carson (1891–1956), mayor of Portland, Oregon, United States
 Jo Carson (Josephine Catron Carson; 1946–2011), American author 
 Joe Carson (footballer) (born 1953), Scottish footballer
 Joe Carson (musician) (1936–1964), American country-music performer
 Joe Carson (Petticoat Junction), a main fictional character on the television sitcom Petticoat Junction